The SEC women's soccer tournament (sometimes known simply as the SEC tournament) is the conference championship tournament in college soccer for the Southeastern Conference (SEC).

Tournament
The tournament has been held annually since 1993.  It is a single-elimination tournament currently consisting of ten teams.

Champions

References

Tournament
NCAA Division I women's soccer conference tournaments